Resipiscent is an independent record label based in San Francisco California. The label was founded in 2005 by James Decker and Thomas Day.

The label publishes a wide range of experimental music and film. Most of its releases are extremely limited editions involving handcrafted package art. Liz Allbee's "Quarry Tones" release is packaged in heavy hand-sewn felt with flowers and shredded circuits scattered inside. Smegma's Live 91-93 relies on dumpster-dived mainstream CDs that the band then defaces to serve as packaging. The Anti-Ear Tre Picoli release appears to be a 7-inch record but contains two mini-CDs and one mini-DVD. Aaartfystte's 22 Short Noise Videos comes in a four-color silkscreen package embellished with hand-carved relief prints by Maw Zuffler. The double CD compilation String of Artifacts requires listeners to solve a word jumble and then a crossword puzzle in order to decode the track listing, with some bands adding to the puzzle by imitating the style of other bands. The Bran(...)Pos "Quaak Muttar" package is a crude but functional pinball machine for which track indexes serve as scoreboard.

The label name revives a word that had fallen into disuse. "Resipiscent" means "a return to one's senses following a brutal experience". Its tagline is "Unburying the meanest in criminally obscure sound."

Roster
 0th
 Aaartfystte
 Anti-Ear
 At Jennie Richie
 Audrey Chen
 Ava Mendoza
 Black Mayonnaise
 Bran(...)Pos
 Cactus
 Core of the Coalman (Jorge Boehringer)
 Critical Monkey
 Earwicker
 Fat Worm of Error
 Hans Grusel's Krankenkabinet
 Kenta Nagai
 Liz Allbee
 Loachfillet
 Masonic Youth
 Midmight
 Miya Masaoka
 Nerfbau
 Noel Von Harmonson
 Occasional Detroit
 Peter B
 Porest
 The Ritualistic School of Errors
 Scott Arford
 SIXES
  fetish
 Smegma
 Tarantism
 Xome, Tralphaz, Eco Morti

See also
 List of record labels

References

External links
 Official site
 SFWeekly review of Resipiscent release party

American independent record labels
Record labels established in 2005